Liam Killeen (born 12 April 1982), is a British professional mountain biker. He represented England in cross country racing at the Commonwealth Games in 2002 where he came 3rd, and became Commonwealth Champion in 2006. He has won the British Mountain Biking National Champion over five consecutive years; 2008, 2009, 2010, 2011 and 2012. He competed for Great Britain at the 2004 and 2008 Summer Olympics and was chosen as the sole male cross-country rider for the British team for the London Games in 2012.

Early life
Killeen had been interested in cycling from a young age, but a trip to the Malvern Classic introduced him to cross-country cycling when he was about thirteen. He had previously been interested in motocross.

Career

Having won multiple titles both at the junior and Under-23 levels, he competed at the 2002 Commonwealth Games in Manchester, where he took the bronze medal. Despite having won his first major medal at the international level, he continued to compete in Under-23 events, winning the silver medal at the Under-23 World Championship in 2004.

Prior to the 2004 Summer Olympics, he won the test event on the Olympic track in Greece. Competing in the Games themselves for the British team, he was held up by a crash early on in the race and ended up finishing in fifth place, outside of the medal spots.

He returned to the English team at the 2006 Commonwealth Games in Melbourne, Australia. Having placed third at the previous Games, he went two places better, taking the gold medal for his country. In 2007, he suffered from chronic fatigue syndrome and could not compete for an entire season.

He competed once more for the British team at the 2008 Summer Olympics in Beijing, and was considered one of the favourites for the gold medal. Only  into the race, his handlebars clipped a race marker, flipping him over the bars and off the bike. This left him in last place chasing the rest of the pack, but he managed to move up to seventh place by the finish. He did not get the chance to defend his gold medal at the 2010 Commonwealth Games as mountain biking had been dropped from the games, replaced by archery in the schedule. He considered a switch to road racing to take part in the Games.

He was selected as part of the British team to compete at the 2012 Summer Olympics in London, where he hoped to achieve a podium finish, but crashed out on the second lap of the race. He was the only athlete competing for Britain in the men's cross country. As part of his training, he conducted practice runs at the Olympic track near Southend.

He competed at the 2014 Commonwealth Games, finishing in 6th place.

Major results

Mountain Bike
Source:

2002
 1st  National Under-23 XC Championships
2003
 1st  Overall UCI Under-23 XC World Cup
1st Evathlon
1st Roc d'Azur
1st European Cup No. 2
1st UK National Point Series
1st European Cup No. 1
2004
 1st  National Under-23 XC Championships
 1st  Overall UCI Under-23 XC World Cup
1st NORBA Pro Men's XC, Mount Snow, Vermont (USA)
 5th Cross-country, Olympic Games
2005
1st NPS XC #5 – Sherwood Pines (GBR)
1st NORBA XC #4 – Schweitzer Mtn (USA)
1st Firecracker 50 Marathon – Breckenridge (USA)
1st World Cup MX #3 – Mt Sainte Anne (CAN)
2006
 1st  Cross-country, Commonwealth Games
British National Series XC No. 4 (GBR) – 1st
2008
 1st NORBA Marathon #2 – Nova (USA)
 1st  National XC Championships
 7th Cross-country, Olympic Games
2009
 1st  National XC Championships
 National XC Series
1st Crow Hill
1st Margam Park
2010
 1st  National XC Championships
 National XC Series
1st Dalby Forest
1st Wasing Park
2nd Margam Park
2011
 1st  National XC Championships
 National XC Series
1st Wasing Park
1st Newnham Park
2012
 1st  National XC Championships
 National XC Series
1st Sherwood Pines
1st Dalby Forest
2014
 2nd National XC Championships
 National XC Series
2nd Cannock Chase
2015
 National XC Series
1st Cannock Chase
2nd Builth Wells
2016
 National XC Series
1st Newnham Park
1st Builth Wells
2nd Pembrey Country Park
 3rd National XC Championships

Cyclo-cross

2004
 1st  National Under-23 CX Championships
2016
 1st  National CX Championships

References

External links

1982 births
Living people
English male cyclists
English people of Irish descent
Cross-country mountain bikers
Commonwealth Games gold medallists for England
Commonwealth Games bronze medallists for England
Cyclists at the 2002 Commonwealth Games
Cyclists at the 2006 Commonwealth Games
Cyclists at the 2008 Summer Olympics
Olympic cyclists of Great Britain
People from Malvern, Worcestershire
Cyclists at the 2004 Summer Olympics
Cyclists at the 2012 Summer Olympics
Cyclists at the 2014 Commonwealth Games
Commonwealth Games medallists in cycling
Sportspeople from Worcestershire
Medallists at the 2002 Commonwealth Games
Medallists at the 2006 Commonwealth Games